The S7, also known the train of the vines, is a railway service of RER Vaud that provides hourly service between  and  in the Swiss canton of Vaud. Swiss Federal Railways, the national railway company of Switzerland, operates the service.

Operations 
The S7 is the only service over the line.

History 

RER Vaud introduced the S7 designation with the December 2015 timetable change, replacing the S31. Both routes operated between Puidoux and Vevey.

References

External links 

 2022 timetable

RER Vaud lines
Transport in the canton of Vaud